Long Rock is a village in west Cornwall, England, United Kingdom. Long Rock is on the shore of Mount's Bay at the centre of the three-mile beach which stretches from Penzance to Marazion. The beach is backed by a seawall along which runs the main line railway and the South West Coast Path.

A dual carriageway bypass carries the A30 road north of the village and the land beside the road has been extensively developed with light industry and a retail park. Penzance Heliport is situated between Long Rock and Penzance. The original heliport was demolished in 2014 and a Sainsburys supermarket, car park and trading estate was built on the site. In 2019 new heliport was built on a site opposite the heliport trading estate a hundred yards away from the original heliport and in the spring of 2020 commenced a scheduled service to the Scilly Isles.

Facilities
The nearest primary schools are located in Gulval and Ludgvan, with the nearest secondary school, Humphry Davy School, in Penzance. Village facilities include a shop, post office, two pubs (one offering B & B), a care home, an equestrian and agricultural supplier, a hall which can be hired, two motorbike training places, a car rental business and several car sales businesses. The industrial estate contains a glass merchant, a computer repairer, a vet and a solar energy firm.

Long Rock Playing Field Association recently received a grant to install new play equipment. Penwith District Council built a new 'amenity area' in a field close to the A30.

Marazion Marsh, an RSPB nature reserve leased from Lord St Levan, is situated half-a-mile east of the village.

The local community radio station is Coast FM (formerly Penwith Radio), which broadcasts on 96.5 and 97.2 FM.

Transport
Long Rock is the site of a locomotive shed. Formerly catering to steam locomotives, it is the most south-westerly depot on the former Great Western Railway's system. Now known as Penzance TMD, it is a refuelling and servicing depot for diesel locomotives and HST sets.

Long Rock has regular bus services to Penzance and Truro and is on The Cornish Way network of cycle paths.

References

Penzance
Villages in Cornwall